The Army of Republika Srpska (ВРС/VRS), commonly referred to in English as the Bosnian Serb Army, was the military of Republika Srpska, the self-proclaimed Serb secessionist republic, a territory within the newly independent Bosnia and Herzegovina (formerly part of Yugoslavia), which it defied and fought against. Active during the Bosnian War from 1992 to 1995, it continued to exist as the armed forces of RS, one of two entities making up Bosnia and Herzegovina, until 2005 when it was integrated into the Armed Forces of Bosnia and Herzegovina. Forces of the VRS engaged in a number of campaigns, including Operation Corridor 92, Operation Vrbas '92, Operation Bura, and Operation Spider; they were also involved in the siege of Sarajevo, as well as the Srebrenica massacre.

Personnel

The Army of the Republika Srpska (VRS) was founded on 12 May 1992 from the remnants of the Yugoslav People's Army (JNA) of the former Socialist Federal Republic of Yugoslavia from which Bosnia and Herzegovina had seceded earlier in 1992. When the Bosnian War erupted, the JNA formally discharged 80,000 Bosnian Serb troops. These troops, who were allowed to keep their heavy weapons, formed the backbone of the newly formed Army of the Republika Srpska.

Aside from being made up largely of ethnic Serbs from Bosnia and Herzegovina, the VRS also included ca. 4,000 foreign Orthodox Christian volunteers. 700 of whom came from Russia, and 300–800 from Bulgaria. 100 Greeks also volunteered to fight on the side of the Bosnian Serbs, forming the Greek Volunteer Guard which allegedly participated in the Srebrenica massacre.

Post-war status and abolishment 
After the war, the country of Bosnia and Herzegovina had two armies, that of the VRS and the Army of the Federation of Bosnia and Herzegovina (AFBiH). AFBiH was itself composed out of two elements, the ARBiH and HVO. The two armies functioned without a common command, on the principle of "non-intervention in the affairs of the other". Bisera Turković noted that it was 'therefore questionable whether in say a foreign attack on Sarajevo [...the VRS] would defend this capital city'. The existence of the two separate armies was one of the factors impeding civil-military relations development. The VRS conducted demining.

In 2003 the army began to integrate into the Armed Forces of Bosnia and Herzegovina. In 2005 a fully integrated unit of Serbs, Bosniaks, and Croats was deployed to augment the US-led coalition forces in Iraq. On 6 June 2006, it was fully integrated into the Armed Forces of Bosnia and Herzegovina controlled by the Ministry of Defence of Bosnia and Herzegovina.

Leadership

The supreme commander of the VRS was General Ratko Mladić, later indicted at the International Criminal Tribunal for the Former Yugoslavia (ICTY) for genocide, as were some other high-ranking Serb officers. Mladić was arrested in Serbia on 26 May 2011.

Military operations
Operation Corridor 92 (24 June – 6 October 1992) against Croatian forces; victory
Operation Vrbas '92 (June – October 1992) against ARBiH and HVO; victory
Mitrovdan offensive (8–13 November 1992) against HVO, HOS, HV; victory
Operation Spider (December 1994) against ARBiH; victory
Battle of Orašje (5 May – 10 June 1995) against Croatian forces; defeat

Special units 
 Panthers Guard Special Brigade (Garda Panteri), East-Bosnian Corps 
 Wolves from the Drina, or Drina Wolves, Drina Corps
 Special Unit "Mando", East-Bosnian Corps
 Special Unit "Osmaci", Drina Corps
 Serb Guard Ilidža, Sarajevo-Romanija Corps
 White Wolves

Organization 

The International Criminal Tribunal for the former Yugoslavia stated that:

"In July 1995, the Armed Forces of the Republika Srpska were under the command and control of the Commander-in-Chief, Radovan Karadžić. His headquarters was in Pale.

Within the framework of the VRS, immediately subordinate to the Commander-in-Chief, was the Main Staff of the VRS, headquartered in Han Pijesak and commanded by General Ratko Mladic. It was the responsibility of the Commander of the Main Staff to issue regulations, orders and instructions regarding the implementation of orders by the Commander-in-Chief, and to discharge the command duties delegated to him by the Commander-in-Chief. The Main Staff of the VRS consisted of staff officers and staff support personnel, as well as some specialised military units such as: the 65th Protection Regiment, designed to provide protection and combat services for the Main Staff; and the 10th Sabotage Detachment, a unit trained for operations behind enemy lines and other special combat assignments.

The vast majority of the fighting force of the VRS itself was divided into six geographically-based Corps, all subordinate to, and under the command of, General Mladic and, in turn, the Commander-in-Chief, Radovan Karadzic. In July 1995, the six Corps were the Drina Corps, the 1st Krajina Corps, the 2nd Krajina Corps, the Sarajevo-Romanija Corps, the Hercegovina Corps and the East Bosnia Corps."

1993 
 1st Krajina Corps – Banja Luka
 2nd Krajina Corps – Drvar
 3rd Corps – Bijeljina
 East Bosnia Corps – Han Pijesak
 Herzegovina Corps – Bileća

1995 
 1st Krajina Corps – Banja Luka
 2nd Krajina Corps – Drvar
 East Bosnia Corps – Bijeljina
 Sarajevo-Romanija Corps – Pale
 Drina Corps – Han Pijesak
 Herzegovina Corps – Bileća

2001 
 1st Corps – Banja Luka
 3rd Corps – Bijeljina
 5th Corps – Sokolac
 7th Corps – Bileća

Equipment

Tanks and armoured vehicles 

 M-84
 T-54/55
 T-34
 BVP M-80
 OT M-60
 BTR-50
 BOV

Towed artillery 

 M-56
 D-30
 M-30
 M-46
 D-20
 M-84
 M-1
 ZiS-3

Self-propelled artillery 
 2S1 Gvozdika

MLRS 

 M-63 Plamen
 M-77 Oganj
 M-87 Orkan

ATGM 
 AT-3 "Sagger" and AT-5 "Konkurs"

Antitank guns 
 T-12

Self-Propelled Anti-Aircraft Guns (SPAAG) 

 ZSU-57-2
 M53/59 Praga
 BOV-3
 ZU-23-2

MANPADs and SAMs 
 SA-7
 SA-18
 SA-6
 SA-9

Infantry weapons

Pistols
 Zastava M88
 Zastava M57
 CZ-99

Assault rifles
 Zastava M70
 Zastava M80
 Zastava M90

Battle rifles
 Zastava M77B1

Submachine guns
 Zastava M56
 Zastava M85
 Zastava M92
 Heckler & Koch MP5

Machine guns
 Zastava M53
 Zastava M77
 Zastava M72
 Zastava M84
 Zastava M87
M2 Browning

Sniper rifles
 Zastava M76
 Zastava M91

Anti-tank weapons
 M79 Rocket Launcher
 M80 Zolja

Republika Srpska Air Force 

Formerly known as Ratno Vazduhoplovstva i Protiv Vazdušna Odbrana Vojske Republike Srpske or RV i PVO RS. Beginning on 1 June 2004, the Republika Srpska Air Force was officially called, Prvi Puk Vazduhoplovstva i Protiv Vazdušna Odbrana Vojske Republike Srpske, also known as 1st Aviation Regiment and Air Defence Force of the Republic of Srpska's Army.

See also 
 Military ranks of Republika Srpska

References

Books 
 
 
 

 
1992 establishments in Bosnia and Herzegovina
2006 disestablishments in Bosnia and Herzegovina
Military of Republika Srpska
Military units and formations established in 1992
Military units and formations disestablished in 2006
Military units and formations of the Bosnian War
Serbian nationalism in Bosnia and Herzegovina
Rebel militia groups